Dustin O'Halloran (born September 8, 1971) is an American composer and pianist. Aside from releasing music as a recording artist, O'Halloran is a film and TV composer, as well as one half of ambient act A Winged Victory for the Sullen.

Early life 

O'Halloran was born in Phoenix, Arizona, and spent most of his childhood in Hawaii and Los Angeles. While studying art at Santa Monica College, he met singer Sara Lov, with whom he founded indie rock band Dévics in 1998. When the group signed with Bella Union in 2001, they relocated to Romagna, Italy, where O'Halloran lived for seven years.

Career

Solo work 
In 2004, O'Halloran released his first record as a solo artist, Piano Solos. He has since released three more solo records, the latest of which is Lumiere (2011), which featured contributions by Peter Broderick and Adam Wiltzie (Stars of the Lid), and was mixed by Jóhann Jóhannsson.

In 2019, O'Halloran signed with Deutsche Grammophon and released his first EP on the label, entitled Sundoor.

A Winged Victory For The Sullen 
With A Winged Victory for the Sullen, his collaboration with Adam Wiltzie, O'Halloran has released three studio albums, A Winged Victory for the Sullen (2011), Atomos (2014) and The Undivided Five (2019). The second of which was also the original score for the identically titled dance piece by choreographer Wayne McGregor and his company Wayne McGregor Random Dance.

In 2015, they were invited to perform at the Royal Albert Hall in London as part of the BBC Proms. The duo scored their first film together in 2016, entitled In the Shadow of Iris by French director Jalil Lespert.

In 2019, A Winged Victory for the Sullen signed with UK-based indie label Ninja Tune.

Film score works 
Since the release of Piano Solos Volumes 1 and 2 in 2004 and 2006, O'Halloran has gone on to score a number of films and TV shows. These include Sofia Coppola's 2006 film Marie Antoinette, and Drake Doremus’ Like Crazy (2011), which won the Grand Jury Prize at Sundance. In 2014, O’Halloran worked on Indian drama Umrika, which won the Audience Award at Sundance, and gave him his first opportunity to compose for a full string orchestra.

In the same year he was also asked to provide the music for Transparent, the acclaimed TV series created by Jill Soloway for Amazon Studios. 

O'Halloran was awarded the Primetime Emmy Award for Outstanding Main Title Theme Music for his original theme for Transparent in 2015.

In 2016, he collaborated with Hauschka (Volker Bertelmann) on the score for the Oscar-nominated film Lion. The score of the film was nominated for many major awards including the Academy Awards, Golden Globes, BAFTAs and Critics’ Choice Awards. He has since collaborated with Bertelmann on a number of other scores, including Ammonite (2020).

Discography

Solo albums

Soundtrack albums 
 Marie Antoinette (Verve Forecast/Polydor, 2006)
 An American Affair (Splinter, 2009)
 Now Is Good (Polydor, 2012)
 Like Crazy (Relativity Music, 2012)
 The Beauty Inside (Splinter, 2013)
 Breathe In (Milan Records, 2013)
 Umrika (Splinter, 2015)
 Iris (Erased Tapes, 2016) (as A Winged Victory For The Sullen)
 Lion (Sony Music, 2016) (with Hauschka)
 Save Me (Sky, 2018)
 Puzzle (Sony Music, 2018)
The Hate U Give (Milan Records, 2018) (with Volker Bertelmann)
 The Art of Racing in the Rain (Hollywood Records, 2019) (with Volker Bertelmann)
 Save Me Too (SATV/Save Me Too, 2020)
 A Christmas Carol (Hollywood Records, 2020) (with Volker Bertelmann)
 The Old Guard (Lakeshore Music, 2020) (with Volker Bertelmann)

With Devics
 If You Forget Me (Bella Union, 1998 — writer, co-producer)
 My Beautiful Sinking Ship (Bella Union, 2001 — writer, co-producer)
 The Stars at St. Andrea (Bella Union, 2003 — writer, producer)
 Push the Heart (Filter, 2006 — writer, producer)

With A Winged Victory for the Sullen
 A Winged Victory for the Sullen (Kranky, 2011 — Arranger, Composer, Engineer, Main Personnel, Score)
Atomos (Kranky, 2014 — Arranger, Composer, Engineer, Primary Artist, Score)
Iris (Erased Tapes, 2016)
 God's Own Country (2017)
The Undivided Five (Ninja Tune, 2019)

Other collaborations
 With Katy Perry: 'Into Me You See' from Witness.

Filmography

Awards

Personal life 
Dustin O'Halloran divides his time between Reykjavík and Los Angeles.

References

External links
 
 
 psychoPEDIA interview

1971 births
Living people
American male composers
21st-century American composers
Musicians from Los Angeles
Santa Monica College alumni
American male pianists
21st-century American pianists
21st-century American male musicians
Bella Union artists
Deutsche Grammophon artists
FatCat Records artists